Pino d'Asti is a comune (municipality) in the Province of Asti in the Italian region Piedmont, located about  east of Turin and about  northwest of Asti.

Pino d'Asti borders the following municipalities: Albugnano, Castelnuovo Don Bosco, and Passerano Marmorito.

References

Cities and towns in Piedmont